No Limit is a 1935 British musical comedy starring George Formby and Florence Desmond. The film, which was directed by Monty Banks, was made on location at the TT motorcycle race on the Isle of Man. It was the first of eleven films that Formby made for Associated Talking Pictures.

Although Formby had already made two moderately successful films (Boots! Boots! and Off the Dole), No Limit was the film that put him on the road to stardom.

Plot
George Shuttleworth (Formby) is a chimney sweep from Wigan who dreams of winning the Isle of Man TT. Unfortunately, George's attempts to secure a factory ride with the Rainbow Motorcycle Company are unsuccessful and consequently he resorts to entering his own machine the "Shuttleworth Snap", a motorcycle derived from an old Rainbow machine. Whilst running the engine of his machine, George inadvertently knocks the motorcycle off its stand and crashes into the fence of his next door neighbour, Mr Hardacre, who goads George about his dream of winning the T.T.

Undeterred, George asks his mother if she could lend him £5 so he can make his way to the Isle of Man in order to compete at the races. Although unable to give him the £5 directly, George's mother endeavours to take the money from his Grandpa's savings which he keeps concealed in the lining of the settee. With money 'borrowed' from his grandfather, George make his way by train to Liverpool and embarks on the steamer for Douglas.

As he prepares to embark, George's attention is drawn to the arrival of better known T.T. competitors – such as Bert Tyldesley – who embarks onto the steamer with the secretary of boss of the Rainbow Motorcycle Company, Florrey Dibney (Florence Desmond). George attempts to be included in a photograph with Tyldesley and another T.T. rider -Norton-, but as they assemble for the photograph, George observes a stray cargo crate heading towards them. In order to save Florrie from being struck by the crate, George pushes her out of the way and consequently knocks her hat over the side of the ship.

More concerned at the loss of her hat than the danger posed by the cargo crate, Florrie takes George to task, and he resolves to climb down the side of the ship to retrieve the hat. As George begins to descend the side of the ship on a rope, the order is given to cast off and the deck hands begin to haul in the rope just as George reaches the ship's side belting. Holding onto the very end of the rope, it is suddenly hauled up and George falls into the water.

Evading the rivals who have paid him not to compete, George makes it to the start with seconds to spare. He rides like fury, and most of his rival riders are knocked out by crashes or blown engines. With yards to go, his bike conks out and he pushes it over the line to win; a split-second ahead of his fellow rider.

So he not only succeeds in winning the race, but gets the girl as well.

Cast

George Formby as George Shuttleworth
Florence Desmond as Florrie Dibney
Edward Rigby as Grandfather Shuttleworth
Florence Gleason as Mrs Shuttleworth
Beatrix Fielden-Kaye as Mrs Horrocks
Howard Douglas as Turner
 Jack Hobbs as Bert Tyldesley
Alf Goddard as Norton
Peter Gawthorne as Mr Higgins
Eve Lister as Rita
Evelyn Roberts as BBC Commentator
Ernest Sefton as Mr Hardacre
Arthur Young as Doctor

Production
The screenplay was developed by Tom Geraghty and Fred Thompson from a story written by Walter Greenwood, who had enjoyed literary success with Love on the Dole published the year before the film's release.

Filming

The 1935 Isle of Man TT was used as the backdrop by the film's producers. Many locations on the Isle of Man were featured in the film, these included Douglas Beach, White City, Douglas Head Road, Douglas Palace Ballrooms and the Douglas Camera Obscura. The , the newest addition to the fleet of the Isle of Man Steam Packet Company, was used for scenes shot in Liverpool.

However, filming was not an easy proposition because of Formby's wife: Beryl Ingham, who was also his business manager. Her behaviour towards the cast and crew was both difficult and domineering. Film historian Matthew Sweet described the set as a "battleground" because of her actions. Director Monty Banks approached Basil Dean, the head of  Associated Talking Pictures (ATP), to have Ingham barred from the production but was unsuccessful. Ingham's constant attempts to maximise the publicity surrounding Formby's appearance in the film also led to tension with fellow co-star, Florence Desmond. It finally came to a head when Ingham put billboards up on the production vans stating: "Associated Pictures now filming No Limit with George Formby". Desmond threatened to quit until Formby defused the situation by quietly removing the signs after his wife had left for the day.

Motorcycles

Real motorcycle manufacturers are not referenced in the film, and instead contemporary motorcycles were customised and given fictitious names - being primarily the Rainbow Motorcycle Company and the Sprocket Motorcycle Company.

For example, Formby took to the Isle of Man a 1928 AJS H5, which was referred to as a 1928 Rainbow, which had been modified and 'streamlined' by his character to become the Shuttleworth Snap. Following his exploits in the trial, Formby's character is approached by Mr. Turner, who represents the Sprocket Motorcycle Company originally to offer him a deal to ride.

Mistakenly Formby's character lays himself open to a bribe by stating that he "wouldn't ride again for fifty quid", a bribe which Turner is happy to pay, and ensures such by taking the Shuttleworth Snap up to the Marine Drive where Formby's character rides it over a cliff.

However unbeknownst to anyone, Floree has contacted her boss at Rainbow, Mr. Higgins, requesting that the company sign Formby's character and Higgins, arrives on the Island to that effect together with a brand new motorcycle which the character subsequently rides in the race.

Other bikes that were used include a 350cc Ariel that had been flown to the Isle of Man, partly dismantled, in a de Havilland Dragon Rapide.

Stunts
Many of the racing scenes in the film were performed by motorcycling riders from the Isle of Man such as brothers Bertie and Harold Rowell. They were paid £75 per day for their appearances. Members of the Peveril Motor Cycle Club also carried out some of the stunts, including Cyril Standen who crashed into the front-door of the Ballacraine Hotel and the crash into the river at Sulby. Jack Cannell also featured as a stunt rider wearing bib number 15.

Harold Rowell ended up performing more of the rider scenes than any other member of the Peveril Motorcycle and Light Car Club. At one stage members of the club, engaged in the stunts, staged a walkout in order to gain a better financial deal. They were originally offered £2 per day, but they subsequently discovered that the two professionals and a number of less experienced riders were being paid £20 per week, plus accommodation at the Majestic Hotel.

Formby did perform some stunts himself including the scene where his character weaves in and out of his rival's machines on the Cronk-y-Voddy Straight. At the climax of the film, Formby needs to win the race by pushing his bike the final 500 yards to the winning line. In the scene used in the film, Formby is seen collapsing. This was real; after doing 15 takes in hot weather, he fell down and a doctor was requested.

Soundtrack
 "Riding in the TT Races". Performed by George Formby and written by Cliffe & Gifford
 "Riding Around on a Rainbow".  Performed by George Formby and Florence Desmond and written by Fred E. Cliffe
 "In a Little Wigan Garden". Performed by George Formby and written by Cliffe & Gifford
 "Your Way is My Way". Performed by George Formby and written by Harry Parr-Davis

Reception
The film was released in late October 1935 and was an immediate commercial success. It was reissued in 1938, 1946 and 1957. In 1936, the film put Formby fourth on the list of top box-office draws at the cinema in the UK.

Although The Observer thought that parts of No Limit were "pretty dull stuff", the race footage was "shot and cut to a maximum of excitement". The reviewer thought that "our Lancashire George is a grand lad; he can gag and clown, play the banjo and sing with authority ... Still and all, he doesn't do too bad."

Notes
Citations

External links

Photos
 No Limit film still (retrieved 16 November 2006)
 No Limit film still (retrieved 6 November 2006)
 No Limit film still (retrieved 6 November 2006)

Other
  (retrieved 6 November 2006
 IOM Guide for No Limit (retrieved 6 November 2006)

1935 films
1935 musical comedy films
1930s sports comedy films
British auto racing films
British musical comedy films
British sports comedy films
British black-and-white films
1930s English-language films
Motorcycle racing films
Films directed by Monty Banks
Associated Talking Pictures
Isle of Man TT
Films shot in the Isle of Man
1930s British films